Events in the year 1859 in Belgium.

Incumbents
Monarch: Leopold I
Head of government: Charles Rogier

Events
 Fabrique d'armes Émile et Léon Nagant established in Liège
 Railway line from Namur to Arlon completed
 18 April – Five-year commercial treaty with France (1854) extended for two more years.
 14 June – Partial legislative elections
 19 July – Auguste Orts replaces Pierre-Théodore Verhaegen as speaker of the Chamber of Representatives.
 9 August – Modeste Decroix (in religion Fr François) and Louis-Joseph Miroux (in religion Br François), both of Scourmont Priory, condemned to twenty years and ten years hard labour respectively on multiple counts of sexual assault.
 31 August – Belgian Chamber of Representatives votes to fortify Antwerp as a National Redoubt.
 3 November – Celebration of the 25th anniversary of the founding of the Catholic University of Leuven.
 24 November – Breve of Pope Pius IX congratulating the Catholic University of Leuven on its twenty-fifth anniversary.

Art and architecture

Paintings
 Alfred Stevens, Will you come out with me, Fido?

Publications
Periodicals
 Almanach de poche de Bruxelles (Brussels, Tircher)
 Annales de pomologie belge et étrangère, vol. 7.
 Annuaire de l'Académie royale de Belgique, vol. 25
 Annuaire de la noblesse de Belgique, vol. 13, edited by Isidore de Stein d'Altenstein
 Annuaire statistique et historique belge, vol. 6, edited by Auguste Scheler
 La Belgique, 8
 La Belgique Horticole, vol. 9.
 Bibliographie de la Belgique, ou Catalogue général de l'imprimerie et de la librairie belges, vol. 22 (Brussels, Charles Muquardt)
 Bulletins de l'Académie royale des sciences et belles-lettres de Bruxelles (Brussels, Hayez).
 Bulletin et annales de l'Académie d'archéologie de Belgique, vol. 6
 Collection de précis historiques, vol. 8, edited by Edouard Terwecoren S.J.
 Journal de l'armée belge, vol. 17
 Journal d'horticulture pratique de la Belgique
 Le Moniteur Belge 
 Recueil consulaire contenant les rapports commerciaux
 Recueil des lois et arrêtés royaux de la Belgique, vol. 11

Reports and monographs
 XIVe exposition nationale et triennale de Gand. Salon de 1859. Notice sur les tableaux et objets d'arts, exposés à l'ancienne église des PP. Dominicains (Ghent, Vanderhaeghen)
 Charles Bormann, The Shrapnel Shell in England and in Belgium with Some Reflections on the Use of this Projectile in the Late Crimean War; a Historico-technical Sketch (Brussels, Librarie européenne)
 Jules Malou, La question monétaire (Brussels, 1859)
 Edmond Speelman, Belgium Marianum: Histoire du culte de Marie en Belgique y compris l'ancien territoire de Lille, de Douai, de Cambrai, etc.: calendrier belge de la Sainte Vierge (Pairs and Tournai, Casterman)
 Jean Stecher, Flamands et Wallons (Liège, F. Renard)

Literature
 Frans de Cort, Liederen, tweede reeks (Antwerp)

Births
 10 January – Léon Du Bois, organist (died 1935)
 19 January – Marie Nizet, writer (died 1922)
 2 April – Léon Rom, colonial officer (died 1924)
 17 April – Charles van den Eycken, painter (died 1923)
 19 May – Célestin Demblon, politician (died 1924)
 25 May – Renée de Merode, noblewoman (died 1941)
 12 June – Prince Leopold, Duke of Brabant (died 1869)
 19 August – Hippolyte Delehaye, Bollandist (died 1941)
 20 September – Cyriel Buysse, playwright (died 1932)
 7 October – Georgette Meunier, painter (died 1951)
 4 November – Jules Feller, academician (died 1940)
 7 November – Paul de Smeth, philatelist (died 1940)
 11 December – Paul Hankar, architect (died 1901)
 25 December – Jean-François Heymans, pharmacologist (died 1932)

Deaths
 3 March – Cornelis Cels (born 1778), painter
 20 March – Jozef Geirnaert (born 1790), artist
 22 July – Louis de Potter (born 1786), journalist
 13 November – Prudens van Duyse (born 1804), writer

References

 
Belgium
Years of the 19th century in Belgium
1850s in Belgium
Belgium